Knefastia coislinensis is an extinct species of sea snail, a marine gastropod mollusk in the family Pseudomelatomidae, the turrids and allies.

Description

Distribution
This extinct marine species was found in Eocene strata of the Loire inférieure, France.

References

 Cossmann, 1898: Mollusques éocéniques de la Loire inférieure, 1. I, fasc. 3; Bull. soc. Sc. nat. Ouest, t, VI, 1896 (1897-1898).

coislinensis
Gastropods described in 1898